Eddy Annys (born 13 December 1958) is a former high jumper from Belgium, who still remains the national record holder with 2.36 metres (outdoor) and 2.31 m (indoor).

Annys won a bronze medal at the 1986 European Athletics Indoor Championships. In 1983, he was named Belgian Sportsman of the Year.
He is currently active at Randstad Belgium as the Managing Director.

International competitions

References
 

1958 births
Living people
Belgian male high jumpers
Athletes (track and field) at the 1984 Summer Olympics
Olympic athletes of Belgium
Universiade medalists in athletics (track and field)
Place of birth missing (living people)
Universiade silver medalists for Belgium
Medalists at the 1983 Summer Universiade